Acestra is a genus of bugs, in the subfamily Micrelytrinae and tribe Micrelytrini.  Species have been recorded from China and Peninsular Malaysia.

Species 
The Coreoidea.species file lists:
 Acestra malayana Distant, 1903
 Acestra sinica Dallas, 1852 – type species
 Acestra yunnana Hsiao, 1963

References

Note and Links
 Acestra is a synonym of the fish genus Farlowella
 

Hemiptera of Asia
Alydidae